Majidabad (also Romanized as Majīdābād; also known as Medzhidabad) is a village in Sojas Rud Rural District, Sojas Rud District, Khodabandeh County, Zanjan Province, Iran. At the 2006 census, its population was 806, in 171 families.

References 

Populated places in Khodabandeh County